Birgitta is the Swedish and Icelandic form of the Irish Gaelic female name Brighid. Brighid or Brigid was the name of an ancient Celtic goddess, and its English form is Bridget. Birgitta and its alternate forms Birgit and Britta became common names in Scandinavia because of St. Bridget of Sweden.

People named Birgitta
Bridget of Sweden (c. 1303 – 23 July 1373), Swedish Roman Catholic saint
Princess Birgitta of Sweden (born 1937), elder sister of King Carl XVI Gustaf
Birgitta Durell (1619-1683), Swedish industrialist
Birgitta Jónsdóttir (born 1967), Icelandic politician
Birgithe Kühle (1762-1832), Dano-Norwegian editor
Birgitta Moran Farmer (1881-1939), American miniature painter
Birgitta Haukdal (born 1979), Icelandic singer
Birgitte Winther (1751-1809), Danish opera singer
Birgitta Hillingsø (born 1940), Danish antiques dealer and godmother of Crown Prince Frederik of Denmark

References

See also
Brigid (disambiguation)
Bridget

Swedish feminine given names